Keichi Nakajima (中島 啓智, Nakajima Keichi, born 16 November 1998) is a Japanese Paralympic swimmer with an intellectual impairment. He represented Japan at the 2016 Summer Paralympics in Rio de Janeiro, Brazil and he won the bronze medal in the men's 200 metre individual medley SM14 event. He also competed at the 2020 Summer Paralympics in Tokyo, Japan.

In 2018, he competed at the Asian Para Games held in Jakarta, Indonesia and he won two silver medals and two bronze medals.

In 2019, he won the gold medal in the men's 100 metres butterfly multi-class event in Melbourne, Australia as part of the 2019 World Series.

References

External links 
 

Living people
1998 births
Japanese male butterfly swimmers
Japanese male medley swimmers
Swimmers at the 2016 Summer Paralympics
Swimmers at the 2020 Summer Paralympics
Medalists at the 2016 Summer Paralympics
Paralympic bronze medalists for Japan
Paralympic medalists in swimming
Paralympic swimmers of Japan
S14-classified Paralympic swimmers
21st-century Japanese people
Medalists at the 2018 Asian Para Games